In integral calculus, an elliptic integral is one of a number of related functions defined as the value of certain integrals, which were first studied by Giulio Fagnano and Leonhard Euler. Their name originates from their originally arising in connection with the problem of finding the arc length of an ellipse. 

Modern mathematics defines an "elliptic integral" as any function  which can be expressed in the form

In general, integrals in this form cannot be expressed in terms of elementary functions. However, with the appropriate reduction formula, every elliptic integral can be brought into a form that involves integrals over rational functions and the three Legendre canonical forms (i.e. the elliptic integrals of the first, second and third kind).

Besides the Legendre form given below, the elliptic integrals may also be expressed in Carlson symmetric form. Additional insight into the theory of the elliptic integral may be gained through the study of the Schwarz–Christoffel mapping. Historically, elliptic functions were discovered as inverse functions of elliptic integrals.

Argument notation
Incomplete elliptic integrals are functions of two arguments; complete elliptic integrals are functions of a single argument. These arguments are expressed in a variety of different but equivalent ways (they give the same elliptic integral). Most texts adhere to a canonical naming scheme, using the following naming conventions.

For expressing one argument:
 , the modular angle
 , the elliptic modulus or eccentricity
 , the parameter

Each of the above three quantities is completely determined by any of the others (given that they are non-negative). Thus, they can be used interchangeably.

Specifying the value of any one of these quantities determines the others. Some additional relationships involving  include

Sometimes the literature also refers to the complementary parameter, the complementary modulus, or the complementary modular angle. These are further defined in the article on quarter periods.

In this notation, the use of a vertical bar as delimiter indicates that the argument following it is the "parameter" (as defined above), while the backslash indicates that it is the modular angle. The use of a semicolon implies that the argument preceding it is the sine of the amplitude:

This potentially confusing use of different argument delimiters is traditional in elliptic integrals and much of the notation is compatible with that used in the reference book by Abramowitz and Stegun and that used in the integral tables by Gradshteyn and Ryzhik.

There are still other conventions for the notation of elliptic integrals employed in the literature. The notation with interchanged arguments, is often encountered; and similarly  for the integral of the second kind. And the integral of the third kind defined by Gradshteyn and Ryzhik, puts the amplitude  first and not the "characteristic" .

Thus one must be careful with the notation when using these functions, because various reputable references and software packages use different conventions in the definitions of the elliptic functions. For example, Wolfram's Mathematica software and Wolfram Alpha define the complete elliptic integral of the first kind in terms of the parameter , instead of the elliptic modulus .

Incomplete elliptic integral of the first kind
The incomplete elliptic integral of the first kind  is defined as

Equivalently, in terms of the amplitude and modular angle one has:

With  one has:

demonstrating that this Jacobian elliptic function is a simple inverse of the incomplete elliptic integral of the first kind.

The incomplete elliptic integral of the first kind has following addition theorem:

The elliptic modulus can be transformed that way:

Incomplete elliptic integral of the second kind
The incomplete elliptic integral of the second kind  in trigonometric form is

Equivalently, in terms of the amplitude and modular angle:

Relations with the Jacobi elliptic functions include

The meridian arc length from the equator to latitude  is written in terms of :

The incomplete elliptic integral of the second kind has following addition theorem:

The elliptic modulus can be transformed that way:

Incomplete elliptic integral of the third kind
The incomplete elliptic integral of the third kind  is 

or

The number  is called the characteristic and can take on any value, independently of the other arguments. Note though that the value  is infinite, for any .

A relation with the Jacobian elliptic functions is

The meridian arc length from the equator to latitude  is also related to a special case of :

Complete elliptic integral of the first kind

Elliptic Integrals are said to be 'complete' when the amplitude  and therefore . The complete elliptic integral of the first kind  may thus be defined as

or more compactly in terms of the incomplete integral of the first kind as

It can be expressed as a power series

where  is the Legendre polynomials, which is equivalent to

where  denotes the double factorial. In terms of the Gauss hypergeometric function, the complete elliptic integral of the first kind can be expressed as

The complete elliptic integral of the first kind is sometimes called the quarter period. It can be computed very efficiently in terms of the arithmetic–geometric mean:

Therefore the modulus can be transformed that way:

This expression is valid for all  and :

Relation to the gamma function
For example,  and  give, respectively,

and

More generally, the condition that

be in an imaginary quadratic field is sufficient. For instance, if , then  and

Relation to Jacobi theta function
The relation to Jacobi's theta function is given by 

where the nome  is

Asymptotic expressions

Differential equation
The differential equation for the elliptic integral of the first kind is

This solution satisfies the relation

Continued fraction
A continued fraction expansion is: 

Complete elliptic integral of the second kind

The complete elliptic integral of the second kind  is defined as

or more compactly in terms of the incomplete integral of the second kind  as

For an ellipse with semi-major axis  and semi-minor axis  and eccentricity , the complete elliptic integral of the second kind  is equal to one quarter of the circumference  of the ellipse measured in units of the semi-major axis . In other words:

The complete elliptic integral of the second kind can be expressed as a power series

which is equivalent to

In terms of the Gauss hypergeometric function, the complete elliptic integral of the second kind can be expressed as

The modulus can be transformed that way:

Computation

Like the integral of the first kind, the complete elliptic integral of the second kind can be computed very efficiently using the arithmetic–geometric mean.

Furthermore, define

By definition,

Also

Then

In practice, the arithmetic-geometric mean would simply be computed up to some limit. This formula converges quadratically for all . To speed up computation further, the relation  can be used.

and hence can be computed without the need for the infinite summation term. For example,  and  give, respectively,

and

Derivative and differential equation

Complete elliptic integral of the third kind

The complete elliptic integral of the third kind  can be defined as

Note that sometimes the elliptic integral of the third kind is defined with an inverse sign for the characteristic ,

Just like the complete elliptic integrals of the first and second kind, the complete elliptic integral of the third kind can be computed very efficiently using the arithmetic-geometric mean.

Partial derivatives

Functional relations

Legendre's relation:

See also

 Elliptic curve
 Schwarz–Christoffel mapping
 Carlson symmetric form
 Jacobi's elliptic functions
 Weierstrass's elliptic functions
 Jacobi theta function
 Ramanujan theta function
 Arithmetic–geometric mean
 Pendulum period
 Meridian arc

References

Notes

References

Sources

External links

Eric W. Weisstein, "Elliptic Integral" (Mathworld)
Matlab code for elliptic integrals evaluation by elliptic project
Rational Approximations for Complete Elliptic Integrals (Exstrom Laboratories)
A Brief History of Elliptic Integral Addition Theorems

Elliptic functions
Special hypergeometric functions